Miloševići may refer to:

Miloševići, Višegrad, is a village in the municipality of Višegrad, Bosnia and Herzegovina
Miloševići, Plužine, is a village in the municipality of Plužine, Montenegro
Miloševići, Šavnik, is a village in the municipality of Šavnik, Montenegro

See also
Milošević
Miloševo (disambiguation)